Hudson Felipe Gonçalves, known as Hudson (born 24 January 1996) is a Brazilian football player who plays for Santa Cruz de Natal.

Club career
He made his professional debut in the Segunda Liga for Portimonense on 22 February 2017 in a game against Sporting Covilhã.

References

1996 births
Footballers from Rio de Janeiro (city)
Living people
Brazilian footballers
Portimonense S.C. players
Brazilian expatriate footballers
Expatriate footballers in Portugal
Liga Portugal 2 players
Association football midfielders